The Indian locomotive class WCAM–3 is a class of dual-power AC/DC series electric locomotives That was developed in 1997 by Bharat Heavy Electricals Limited used in the Indian Railways system. They are the third locomotives from  the WCAM class. The model name stands for broad gauge (W), DC Current (C), AC Current (A), Mixed traffic (M) locomotive, 3rd generation (3). They entered service in 1997. A total of 53 WCAM-3 were built at BHEL between 1997 and 1998, which made them the most numerous class of mainline dual-power AC-DC electric locomotive. They were specifically designed for use by Central Railways in the Ghat section towards Nashik and Pune.

History 

The WCAM-3 locomotives were developed after Central Railways faced a massive locomotive crisis in the 1990s. During this period, many of the WCM locomotives, which began to show their age, suffered several failures. As a result, CR had a tough time in maintaining train schedules, which led to the demand for a locomotive similar to the WCAM-2/2P, which was already successful in the Western Railways. Thus the WCAM-3 was introduced along with the WCAG-1, with more power and traction.

The locomotive class was jointly developed by RDSO and BHEL in 1997. Components were shared with the WCAG-1 locos (see below). Co-Co fabricated bogies (High-Adhesion—shwered with WCAG-1, WAG-7, WDG-2, etc.) with secondary suspension. Monocoque underframe. Air brakes were original equipment. They were originally manufactured under a BOLT (build-own-lease-transfer) contract with BHEL, and were probably still owned by BHEL rather than by IR. Axle-hung, nose-suspended, force ventilated, taper roller bearings Speed control by tap changers in AC mode and resistance notching in DC mode. Motors can be placed in different series-parallel combinations. Auxiliaries from Elgi, S F India, Best, Gresham & Craven, etc.

Static converter from ACEC for auxiliary supply. In DC mode, rheostatic braking by self-excitation of traction motors available until 17 km/h. Elgi compressor, other auxiliaries from S F India. Rated for 105 km/h in DC mode and AC mode.Traction motor configurations as in the WCAM-1/2 and WAM-4 (all 6 in series, 2S 3P, or all parallel—the latter was the only one used under AC traction, enforced now by modifications to the locos).

Current Usage 

The class are in active service in the Central Railway zone. CR uses WCAM-3 locos on Mumbai-Pune, Diva-Ratnagiri and Mumbai-Igatpuri sections which had ghat portions as well as speed restrictions of about 100 km/h. They also used to haul intercity trains out of Mumbai DC suburban region on Western as well as Central Railway which was on a 1.5 kV DC overhead system, as opposed to other parts of India which had 25 kV 50 Hz AC overhead. WCAM engines now serve trains operating out of Chhatrapati Shivaji Maharaj Terminus (CSMT) and as bankers on Kasara-Igatpuri/Karjat-Lonavla section. Due to exclusivity in operation/maintenance of these locomotives, they do not go beyond the Central Railway's zone limits. These dual-traction models deliver 4600 hp in DC mode and 5000 hp in AC mode, and post 25 kV transformation, WCAMs were fully transformed into pure AC locomotives, and the performance was even more improved.

Freight rakes double-headed by WCAM-3 (upgraded models) are a common sight on the ghat sections. MU operation possible with 3 (4?) units. As of [12/05], all WCAM-3 locos had been retrofitted with roof-mounted rheostatic braking grids. The acceleration is similar to those of WAP-4s and sometimes, it is quoted to match the acceleration levels of WAP-7s, although it's not been verified.

Locomotive shed

Technical specifications

Trains hauled by WCAM-3

Tapovan Express
Kanyakumari–Mumbai Express
Pragati Express
Sahyadri Express
Mumbai–Amravati Express
Nandigram Express
Deccan Queen
Mumbai–Chennai Mail
Koyna Express
Dadar–Madgaon Jan Shatabdi Express
Dadar Central–Ratnagiri Passenger

See also

Locomotives of India
Rail transport in India#History
Rail transport in India 
Indian Railways

References

External links 

 http://www.irfca.org/gallery/Events/cracdcjan13/
 http://www.irfca.org/faq/faq-loco-electric-dc.html#acdc

Electric locomotives of India
1500 V DC locomotives
25 kV AC locomotives
5 ft 6 in gauge locomotives
Multi-system locomotives
BHEL locomotives